Todor Barzov (born 21 February 1953 in Dolna Mitropoliya) is a retired Bulgarian footballer who played as а midfielder.

A skillful free-kick taker, he scored numerous goals from different positions, in a career which spanned almost 18 years.

Honours

Levski Sofia

 Bulgarian champion: 1976–77, 1978–79
 Bulgarian Cup: 1976–77, 1978–79

International

 1973–76 Balkan Cup winner with Bulgaria

References

External links

 Profile at LevskiSofia.info

1953 births
Living people
Bulgarian footballers
Bulgaria international footballers
Association football midfielders
First Professional Football League (Bulgaria) players
Super League Greece players
Cypriot First Division players
PFC Spartak Pleven players
PFC Levski Sofia players
Doxa Drama F.C. players
Panionios F.C. players
Apollon Limassol FC players
Bulgarian expatriate footballers
Expatriate footballers in Greece
Bulgarian expatriate sportspeople in Greece
Expatriate footballers in Cyprus